Aidana Shayakhmetova (born 16 December 2005) is a Kazakh rhythmic gymnast, member of the national group.

Personal life 
Aidana took up the sport at age seven, her sister Dayana represented Kazakhstan as a member of the group along her at the 2021 World Championships. She speaks Russian and English.

Career 
In 2021 Shayakhmetova entered the rooster of the national senior group, competing at the World Cup in Tashkent, ending 8th in the All-Around, with 5 balls and 3 hoops and 4 clubs. Two weeks later, in Baku, the group was 17th in the All-Around. In October she competed at the World Championships in Kitakyushu, taking 16th place in the All-Around and with both 5 hoops and 3 hoops and 4 clubs. In August 2022 Aidana competed at the 2021 Islamic Solidarity Games in Konya where the group won bronze in the All-Around and with 5 hoops.

References 

Living people
2005 births
Kazakhstani rhythmic gymnasts